The Cheshire flag is the flag of the county of Cheshire in North West England. It was registered by the Flag Institute on 10 April 2013, the design being a banner of arms of the former Cheshire County Council, granted on 3 May 1938.

Flag design
On the flag are three golden sheaves of wheat and a golden blade on a blue background. The design has been associated with the Earldom of Chester since the 12th century, and has been used in the coat of arms of Chester since at least 1560.

Use
The flag has been flown alongside the Union Flag above the Department for Communities and Local Government. Stockport County have had a Cheshire Flag Day to commemorate Stockport's roots in the historic county of Chester.

The wheat sheaves and blue background are incorporated into the logo for Cheshire West and Chester Council and the wheat sheaves are incorporated into the logo for Cheshire East Council. Additionally, the logo of Stockport County F.C. features the three golden sheaves of wheat and golden blade on a blue background as its escutcheon.

References

External links

[ Flag Institute – Cheshire]

Cheshire
Cheshire
Cheshire